Can You Keep It Up For A Week? is a 1974 British sex comedy film.

Plot
Accident-prone Gil wants a steady job but is dismissed by every company that recruits him due to his unfortunate habit of ending up in sexually embarrassing situations. His girlfriend Annette says that she will marry him only if he can stay employed for at least a week. Hired by Mr Grimwood's cleaning company "Here To Service You", Gil is unwittingly drawn into a series of bawdy misadventures: sharing a bath with a married woman and getting caught by her husband; having a threesome with a hospital patient and a woman doctor, followed by a foursome with Annette, Grimwood and a woman psychologist; awkward encounters with a gay man and a lesbian; and getting caught by Annette playing strip poker with a group of women. Incredibly, Gil remains in his job, so Annette asks Grimwood to fire him, not knowing that Gil's employer wants to seduce her himself. Gil foils this plot and Annette marries him, but before the couple can have their wedding night Gil collapses on the bed and passes out from exhaustion.

Cast

Jeremy Bulloch as Gil
Sue Longhurst as Mrs Bristol
Neil Hallett as Gerry Grimwood
Richard O'Sullivan as Mr Rose
Valerie Leon as Miss Hampton
Jill Damas as Annette
Olivia Munday as Mrs Hobson
Mark Singleton as Mr Hobson
Joy Harington as Mrs Grimwood
Jenny Cox as Dr Livingstone
Venicia Day as Sue Anne Stanley
Stephanie Marrian as Lesley
Wendy Wax as Baby Doll
Sarah Frampton as Pam
Lindsay Marsh as Gigi
Maria Coyne as Receptionist
Lynne Ross as Secretary
Valerie Phillips as Mechanic
Frances Bennett as Lady Driver
Sally Harrison as Car Wash Customer
Sally Lahee as Madam Chairman
Richard Smith as Applicant
Bridget McConnell as Secretary
Roy Beck as Sailor
Nicholas McArdle as The D.O.G.
Jules Walters as John Thomas
Eddie Sommer as Male Streaker
Mandy Morris as Female Streaker

Critical response
Writing for The Monthly Film Bulletin, David McGillivray listed the film's "fundamental deficiencies" as "dreary sexual encounters, rudimentary direction and 94 minutes of witless Old English puns (the title is a fair example)." He likened the "episodic" plot to those of other sex comedies Secrets of a Door-to-Door Salesman (1973) and Confessions of a Window Cleaner (1974).

References

External links

Can You Keep It Up for a Week? at bfi.org.uk
Can You Keep It Up for a Week? at British Comedy Film

1970s sex comedy films
1974 films
1974 comedy films
1974 independent films
1974 LGBT-related films
British independent films
British LGBT-related films
British sex comedy films
1970s English-language films
Films about couples
Lesbian-related films
1970s British films